Høgheitinden or Heiane is a mountain in Hustadvika Municipality in Møre og Romsdal county, Norway. Locals refer to the mountain as Heiane, and they distinguish between the popular ridge and the summit using the names Lågheiane for the ridge and Høgheiane for the summit.

See also
List of mountains of Norway

References

Mountains of Møre og Romsdal
Hustadvika (municipality)